
Year 413 (CDXIII) was a common year starting on Wednesday (link will display the full calendar) of the Julian calendar. At the time, it was known as the Year of the Consulship of Herclianus and Lucius (or, less frequently, year 1166 Ab urbe condita). The denomination 413 for this year has been used since the early medieval period, when the Anno Domini calendar era became the prevalent method in Europe for naming years.

Events 
 By place 

 Roman Empire 
 Heraclianus, Roman usurper, lands in Italy with a large army to fight Emperor Honorius. He is defeated in Umbria and flees to Carthage, where he is put to death by envoys of Honorius.
 May 8 – Honorius signs an edict providing tax relief for the Italian provinces Tuscia, Campania, Picenum, Samnium, Apulia, Lucania and Calabria, which were plundered by the Visigoths.
 The Visigoths, led by King Ataulf, conquer the towns of Toulouse and Bordeaux by force of arms. After a successful siege of Valence, he captures the usurper Jovinus and his brother Sebastianus. In Narbonne they are executed and their heads are sent to Honorius' court at Ravenna.

 Asia 
 Kumaragupta I succeeds his father Chandragupta II as emperor of the Gupta Empire (India).
 Jangsu becomes ruler of the Korean kingdom of Goguryeo.

 By topic 

 Religion 
 Augustine of Hippo, age 59, begins to write his spiritual book De Civitate Dei (City of God), as a reply to the charge that Christianity was responsible for the decline of the Roman Empire.

Births

Deaths 
 March 7 – Heraclianus, Roman usurper
 September 13 – Marcellinus of Carthage, martyr and saint
 Chandragupta II, emperor of the Gupta Empire
 Gwanggaeto the Great, king of Goguryeo (b. 374)
 Jovinus, Roman usurper of Gaul
 Kumarajiva, Buddhist monk and translator (b. 344)
 Prudentius, Roman Christian poet (b. 348)
 Sebastianus, Roman usurper and brother of Jovinus
 Qiao Zong, warlord and prince of Chengdu

References